Henri Loyrette (born 31 May 1952 in Neuilly-sur-Seine, a suburb of Paris) was the chairman of Admical, a French organisation dedicated to corporate philanthropy., and the former director of the Louvre Museum (2001–2013). He became first curator and then director of the Musée d'Orsay in 1978 and 1994 respectively.

Career

Loyrette's appointment to the directorship of the Louvre Museum was announced on 28 March 2001. According to Resnicow Shroeder Associates, previously Loyrette had "served as Director of the Musée d'Orsay from 1994 to 2001, and curator at the Musée d'Orsay from 1978 to 1999".

Loyrette's contract was extended for another three years (through 2013), during which he was to oversee construction of an expansion in Paris, as well as a new branch in Abu Dhabi.

Exhibitions
Loyrette has organized several exhibitions on diverse subjects, including exhibitions on Edgar Degas, Honoré Daumier, and the origins of Impressionism.

In 2012, Loyrette endorsed an exhibition with photographs by Ahae, the South Korean businessman Yoo Byung-eun, praising his artistic qualities. Following the sinking of the ferry Sewol, Hervé Barbaret, Loyrette's deputy, disclosed to L'Express in 2014 that "The Louvre did not pay a penny to organize this event. Yoo further donated  million (~ million) to The Louvre. Loyrette's decision to rent out the Tuileries Garden, administratively attached to The Louvre, prompted French media as well as Korean expatriates in France to raise their concerns over French cultural institutions accepting self-financed exhibitions in return for donations.

Literary works
Loyrette is also an author, with a total of nineteen books on various subjects, including Degas, Gustave Eiffel, and Marcel Proust. One of his most popular works is his book Nineteenth Century French Art (pictured).

Books
Nineteenth Century French Art
Gustave Eiffel, Fribourg, Office du Livre, 1985
Degas : « Je voudrais être illustre et inconnu », coll. « Découvertes Gallimard » (nº 36), série Arts. Paris, Gallimard, 1988
Trad. into English – Degas: The Man and His Art, "Abrams Discoveries" series, New York, Harry N. Abrams, 1993
Degas: Passion and Intellect, 'New Horizons' series, London, Thames & Hudson, 1993
Degas inédit, (direction de l'ouvrage), La Documentation française, 1989
Degas, Paris, Fayard, 1991
La Famille Halévy. Entre le théâtre et l'histoire, (direction de l'ouvrage), R.M.N.-Fayard, 1996

Exhibitions catalogues
Degas e l'Italia, 1984
Degas, 1988
Impressionnisme. Les Origines, 1994
Cézanne, 1995
Daumier, 1999

Louvre Abu Dhabi
Loyrette endorsed the building of a new Louvre museum in Abu Dhabi, the capital of the United Arab Emirates. This has sparked much controversy both in France and with the international community.

References

Sources
Henri Loyrette at Encyclopædia Britannica

1952 births
Living people
Directors of the Louvre
Members of the Académie des beaux-arts
Officers of the Ordre national du Mérite